The Dickerson 37 is an American sailboat that was designed by George Hazen as a cruiser and first built in 1980.

The design is often confused with a 1983 Bruce Farr racing sailboat design, that was also originally marketed by the manufacturer as the Dickerson 37, but is now usually referred to as the Dickerson 37 (Farr) to differentiate it from the unrelated 1980 design.

Production
The design was built by Dickerson Boatbuilders in the United States, starting in 1980, but it is now out of production.

Design
The Dickerson 37 is a recreational keelboat, built predominantly of fiberglass over an Airex core, with teak wood trim. It has an aft cockpit or optional center cockpit configuration and can have masthead sloop rig, cutter rig or ketch rig, with a mizzen mast. All have aluminum spars. It has a spooned raked stem, a raised counter transom, a skeg-mounted rudder controlled by a wheel and a fixed fin keel. It displaces  and carries  of ballast. Aft cockpit models have  of ballast.

The center cockpit model was available with two interior arrangements. The "standard" has a forward "V"-berth, an "L"-shaped dinette berth, a main cabin settee berth and an aft cabin with two single fore-and-aft berths. The "athwartships aft berth" model provides a double berth facing starboard, in place of the two fore-and-aft berths. The aft cabin can be reached via its own companionway from the cockpit, or below by a passage from the main cabin. Ventilation is provided by main and bow cabin hatches, as well as opening ports.

The aft cockpit model was factory supplied in three different interior designs: "traditional", "tri-cabin" and "short handed". The "traditional" has a bow "V"-berth, with the head just aft, an aft starboard double berth, with a chart table just forward, a port side "L"-shaped dinette table, with a settee berth opposite and a galley located aft on the port side. The "tri-cabin" moves the aft double berth to the port side and creates an enclosed cabin, which includes the navigation station. The "short handed" eliminates the aft berth in favour of a larger navigation station and more aft storage, with the galley aft on the starboard side.

All arrangements include a galley with a three-burner alcohol-fired stove and pressurized water. The cabin sole is of teak and holly and an anchor locker is provided in the bow.

The on-deck woodwork is all teak, including the handrails, cap rails, bow platform and the cockpit coamings. The mizzen mast is equipped with a sail sheet traveler, while only the mainsail has a boom vang. The boat is equipped with three halyard winches and the genoa is sheeted via tracks to the two cockpit genoa winches, or four for cutter configuration boats. Jiffy reefing is installed for both the main and mizzen sails

Operational history
In a 1994 review Richard Sherwood wrote, "the overhangs and sheer have been deliberately designed for a traditional appearance, but the center cockpit and aft cabin are modern. The Dickerson 37 is designed as a cruiser for two or three couples. Dickerson has specialized in cruising ketches for
many years."

See also
List of sailing boat types

Related development
Dickerson 41

Similar sailboats
Alberg 37
Baltic 37
C&C 37
CS 36
Dockrell 37
Endeavour 37
Express 37
Hunter 36-2
Nor'Sea 37
Tayana 37

References

Keelboats
1980s sailboat type designs
Sailing yachts
Sailboat type designs by George Hazen
Sailboat types built by Dickerson Boatbuilders